The R834 road is a regional road in Ireland which links Clontarf with East Wall, County Dublin. 

The road passes through Fairview Park, where it passes over the underground section of the M50 motorway and the River Tolka.

See also 
 Roads in Ireland
 Motorways in the Republic of Ireland

References 

Regional roads in the Republic of Ireland
Roads in County Dublin